Confusion Is Sex is the debut studio album by American noise rock band Sonic Youth. It was released in 1983 by Neutral Records. It has been referred to as an important example of the no wave genre. AllMusic called it "lo-fi to the point of tonal drabness, as the instruments seem to ring out in only one tone, that of screechy noise".

Background and recording 
Confusion Is Sex was recorded by Wharton Tiers in his Chelsea studio (which he had set up in the basement of a building where he worked as a superintendent). It was mostly recorded during Jim Sclavunos' brief tenure as drummer for the band, and he appears on drums for most of the album. As the sessions drew to a close, Sclavunos chose to quit and Bob Bert was invited back. Bert appeared on "Making the Nature Scene" and the live Stooges cover "I Wanna Be Your Dog". Confusion Is Sex is the only Sonic Youth album on which guitarist Lee Ranaldo plays bass, specifically on the song "Protect Me You".

The lyrics to "The World Looks Red" were written by Michael Gira of the band Swans, who would later reuse the same lyrics on the song "The World Looks Red/The World Looks Black" on that band's 2016 album The Glowing Man.

Ranaldo recorded the track "Lee Is Free" solo at home on two tape recorders.

Content 
In a 1984 Trouser Press review, John Leland stated that, on this album, "confusion reigns and happily so. This album sprays out slivers of ringing, reeling, screaming six-string debris, much of it produced with drumsticks and weird tunings. Partaking of Branca's dissonance, Flipper's anarchy and PIL's desperation, these Lower East Side arties capture the violence and hope of their neighborhood. If these sounds hit like an aural root canal, that's just what the doctor ordered."

The cover image is a sketch by bassist Kim Gordon of guitarist Thurston Moore. This image was used on gig posters early in the band's career.

Track listing

Personnel 

Sonic Youth
 Kim Gordon – vocals, bass guitar, guitar, production
 Thurston Moore – vocals, guitar, prepared guitar, bass guitar, production
 Lee Ranaldo – guitar, bass guitar, zither ("Inhuman"), production
 Jim Sclavunos – drums, production
 Bob Bert – drums ("I Wanna Be Your Dog", "Making the Nature Scene"), production

Production
 Wharton Tiers – production, engineering
 John Erskine – engineering assistance

References

External links 

 

Sonic Youth albums
1983 debut albums
Albums produced by Wharton Tiers
SST Records albums
Blast First albums
No wave albums
Noise rock albums by American artists